Ávila is a city in the province of Ávila, Castile and León, Spain.

Ávila or Avila may also refer to:

Places

Spain
 Province of Ávila, in the autonomous community of Castile and León, Spain
 Ávila (Congress of Deputies constituency), the electoral district covering the province
 Ávila (Cortes of Castile and León constituency)
 Ávila (Senate constituency)
 Roman Catholic Diocese of Ávila, in Ávila, Spain

Elsewhere
 Avila (Tampa), an affluent neighborhood in North Tampa
 Əvilə, a municipality in Azerbaijan
 Avila Beach, California
 Cerro El Ávila, a mountain near Caracas, Venezuela

People with the name
 Ávila (surname) (variants include de Ávila, de Avila, D'Ávila or D'Avila, Dávila, Davila or Abila)

Other uses
 Ávila Cathedral, a Romanesque and Gothic church in Ávila, Spain
 Avila TV, a Venezuelan television channel
 Avila University, in the U.S. state of Missouri
 Plan Ávila, a military operation ordered by Venezuelan President Hugo Chávez in April 2002
 Real Ávila CF, a Spanish football team based in Ávila, Spain
 Samsung S5230, also known as Samsung Avila

See also
Avilla (disambiguation)
Ciego de Ávila, in Cuba